Jadwiga Piłsudska-Jaraczewska (28 February 1920 – 16 November 2014) was a Polish pilot, who served in the Air Transport Auxiliary during the Second World War. She was one of two daughters of Józef Piłsudski.

Life and career

Piłsudska was born on 28 February 1920 in Warsaw, the younger daughter of Marshal Józef Piłsudski, Poland's Chief of State (1918–22) and dictator (1926–1935), by the woman who would later become his second wife, Aleksandra Piłsudska (née Aleksandra Szczerbińska).

In 1937 Piłsudska began flying gliders and obtained a pilot's licence. In 1939 she graduated from secondary school and decided to study aircraft engineering at the Warsaw Polytechnic.

In September 1939, Poland was invaded by Germany, initiating the Second World War, and her family realized that under the circumstances it would be prudent to leave the country immediately. Piłsudska fled with her mother and elder sister, Wanda, to Lithuania and eventually arrived in the United Kingdom. She resumed her studies, in 1940, matriculating at Newnham College, Cambridge University in architecture.

Later she acquired her aircraft pilot's license, and in July 1942, she joined the Air Transport Auxiliary. With the rank of Second Officer (Flying Officer) she flew unarmed military aircraft in the skies of wartime Britain and was, with Anna Leska and the Lithuanian-Pole Barbara Wojtulanis, one of several Polish women who served as wartime ferry pilots in Britain.

She took leave of absence to become a student at the Polish School of Architecture, at the Polish University Abroad (housed in Liverpool University), from 1944 to 1946, and then on the Liverpool Town Planning Course from 1946 to 1948.

In 1944, she also married Lieutenant Andrzej Jaraczewski, an officer in the Polish Navy. She had two children: a son, Christopher Joseph (in Polish Krzysztof Józef) and daughter, Jane Mary (in Polish Joanna Maria), who later married Polish politician Janusz Onyszkiewicz.

She worked as an architect for London City Council from 1948, before she and her husband set up their own furniture design business.

Due to the Communist takeover in Poland, she remained in England after the War, as a political émigré. Never accepting British citizenship, she used a Nansen passport, valid for all countries in the world, except Poland.

In 1977, she and her husband took part in the Silver Jubilee of Elizabeth II on board the MGB S-3 during the Thames River Pageant.

In 1990, with the collapse of the Communist government, she returned to Poland and lived in Warsaw.

She died on 16 November 2014, in Warsaw at the age of 94.

Honours

She has been honoured with a Bronze Cross of Merit with Swords and the Commander's Cross of the Order of Polonia Restituta.

See also
Piłsudski family
Bronisław Piłsudski (1866–1918)

References 

1920 births
Józef Piłsudski
Alumni of Newnham College, Cambridge
Alumni of the University of Liverpool
Artists from Warsaw
Women aviators
Glider pilots
Polish aviators
Polish female military personnel
Polish military personnel of World War II
Polish World War II pilots
Polish Air Force officers
Air Transport Auxiliary pilots
Architects from London
Polish emigrants to the United Kingdom
Commanders of the Order of Polonia Restituta
Recipients of the Cross of Merit with Swords (Poland)
2014 deaths
Polish female soldiers
Polish exiles
Children of national leaders
Women in World War II
Military personnel from Warsaw